Mirza Ahmad Ashtiani (1882 – 1975 in Tehran) Iranian Shi'a jurist and philosopher. He taught theology in Tehran for about 40 years.

Birth 
Mirza Ahmad Ashtiani was born in Tehran. He was the fourth and youngest son of Mirza Hassan Ashtiani, a prominent jurist under the reign Mozaffar ad-Din Shah Qajar and Naser al-Din Shah Qajar. He became a jurist and a Shi'a Imam,

Education 
After studying liberal arts, he took courses in the philosophy of law. After his father's death, his education then became more philosophy-centric, and he began teaching in the school Sepahsalar. After a while studying different philosophical subjects,  he took advanced courses in Transcendentalism, Mysticism, medicine, mathematics and astronomy.
In 1961, he headed to Najafm where addition to Mirza Nain and Qazya’aldyn Iraqi, established his own philosophy of parliamentarianism course. After ten years of residence in Najaf, returned to Tehran, Iran, where he spent the rest of his life, teaching social sciences, writing books, and guiding the people.

Students 
 Mustafa Hussaini Tabatabaie
Allama Seyyed jalal al-addin Ashtiani 
 Hassan Hassanzadeh Amoli
 Mirza Mohammad Bagher Ashtiani
 Mohammad Sadeghi Tehrani
 Seyed Abbas Tabatabaei

References 

People from Tehran
Iranian Shia scholars of Islam
1882 births
1975 deaths